Fara may refer to:

Places

Italy 

Fara Gera d'Adda, Bergamo, Lombardy
Fara Filiorum Petri, Chieti, Abruzzo
Fara San Martino,  Chieti, Abruzzo
Fara in Sabina, Rieti, Lazio
Fara Novarese, Novara, Piedmont
Fara Olivana con Sola,  Bergamo, Lombardy
Fara Vicentino, Vicenza, Veneto

Rest of Europe 

Fara, Orkney, Scotland
Fara, Bloke, Slovenia
Fara, Kostel, Slovenia
Fara, located in the Municipality of Prevalje, Slovenia

Rest of World 

Fara, Safad, Israel
Fara, Burkina Faso
Shuruppak or Fara, an ancient city in Sumeria
Al Hashimiyya, Jordan; former name of this place

Other
 Fellow of the Archives and Records Association (FARA)
Future Attack Reconnaissance Aircraft
Friedreich's Ataxia Research Alliance
 Fara (film), a 1999 Russian film
 Fara Rotuman Christmas festival
 FARA 83, an Argentine assault rifle
Foreign Agents Registration Act
Saint Fara
Forum for Agricultural Research in Africa

See also
 Farra (disambiguation)
 Farah (disambiguation)
 Faras (disambiguation)